Change Over Time is a semiannual peer-reviewed academic journal covering the history, theory, and practice of conservation and the built environment. Each issue is devoted to a particular theme. The journal was established in 2011 and is published by the University of Pennsylvania Press and available online through Project MUSE. The editor-in-chief is Frank Matero (University of Pennsylvania). The journal received the 2012 Association of American University Presses' Design Award for Best Journal Design.

Abstracting and indexing 
The journal is abstracted and indexed in the Arts & Humanities Citation Index and Current Contents/Arts & Humanities.

References

External links 
 
 Journal page on Project MUSE

Architectural history journals
Western philosophy
Publications established in 2011
University of Pennsylvania Press academic journals
Biannual journals
English-language journals